Alfred Edward Maumenee, Jr. (September 19, 1913 in Mobile, Alabama – January 18, 1998 in Point Clear, Alabama) was an American ophthalmologist who pioneered treatments for retinal diseases, macular degeneration and glaucoma and was a leading surgeon for corneal transplants and cataracts.

Maumenee received his A.B from the University of Alabama and his M.D. from Cornell Medical College in 1938. He studied at Johns Hopkins's Wilmer Eye Institute under Alan C. Woods and was a resident in ophthalmology from 1942 to 1943. After a tour of duty in the U. S. Navy from 1943 to 1945, he returned to Johns Hopkins as an associate professor. In 1948 he left the Wilmer Eye Institute to head the division of ophthalmology at Stanford Medical School and remained there until 1955 when he returned to the Wilmer Eye Institute as its director. He continued as the Institute's director until his retirement in 1979. In 1968 he was one of the founders of the National Eye Institute.

An 8-story building and an endowed professorship are named for him at the Wilmer Institute, and he received many awards for his achievements in research, writing and teaching.

Awards and honors
1969 — Howe Medal of the American Ophthalmological Society
1972 — Francis I. Proctor Research Medal of the Association for Research in Vision and Ophthalmology
1982 — Gonin Medal of the International Council of Ophthalmology
1985 — Pisart Vision Award of Lighthouse International
1986 — International Duke-Elder Medal of the International Council of Ophthalmology

References

External links
The 10 most influential ophthalmologists in the 20th century, squintmaster.com
Maumenee Genealogy: Lulie Stinson's Maumenee's Recollection, Rad's memoir, & Rad's Brother Dr. Alfred Edward Maumenee, Jr — Sunday, October 14, 2012

1913 births
1998 deaths
Cornell University alumni
Johns Hopkins University faculty
Stanford University faculty
American ophthalmologists
American surgeons
20th-century surgeons